Benoît Payan (born 31 January 1978) is a French politician who has served as Mayor of Marseille since 2020. He is a member of the Socialist Party (PS).

Early life
Payan was born and raised in Pont-de-Vivaux, in the 10th arrondissement of Marseille. During his studies to become a notary, he joined the Young Socialist Movement.

Career
Elected as a city councillor in 2014, Payan became leader of the Socialist group and the opposition to conservative mayor Jean-Claude Gaudin in 2016. In 2015, he was also elected a departmental councillor in Bouches-du-Rhône.

In July 2019, Payan was one of the founders of Printemps marseillais ("Marseille Spring"), a broad left-wing electoral alliance seeking to end Gaudin's quarter-century in office in the 2020 elections. He criticised the candidacy of Socialist dissenter Samia Ghali, believing it could divide the vote and hand victory to the right by default.

Payan's coalition won the election in July, installing Europe Ecology – The Greens member Michèle Rubirola as Marseille's first woman and Green mayor. She resigned on 15 December 2020, transferring roles with Payan, her first deputy. On 21 December he was officially voted into office, with support from Ghali's eight councillors and without competition from the right.

Policies
Payan supports the city selling the Stade Vélodrome football stadium, but only to its tenants, Olympique de Marseille. He has criticised the environmental impact of cruise liners on Marseille. While in opposition, Payan collected 10,000 signatures against a public–private partnership plan to spend €1 billion demolishing and rebuilding over 30 primary schools.

References

1978 births
Living people
21st-century French politicians
French city councillors
Politicians from Marseille
Mayors of Marseille
Departmental councillors (France)
Socialist Party (France) politicians